Stéphane Moulin (27 October 1963 – 8 November 2020) was a French football referee.

Biography
Moulin began his officiating career in 1991, presiding over games in Ligue 1 and Ligue 2. He also served as President of the Arbitration Committee of the Ligue de Franche-Comté de football.

Stéphane Moulin died in Paris on 8 November 2020, at the age of 57.

References

1963 births
2020 deaths
French football referees
Sportspeople from Rennes
21st-century French people